The Someș (or Samosch) is a left tributary of the Tisza in Hungary and Romania. The Someș is the fifth largest river by length and volume in Romania. The hydrographic basin forms by the confluence at Mica, a commune about 4 km upstream of Dej, of Someșul Mare and Someșul Mic rivers. Someșul Mic (formed by the confluence of Someșul Rece with Someșul Cald) originates in the Apuseni Mountains, and Someșul Mare springs from the Rodna Mountains.

Someșul Mare has a length of 130 km and an area of 5,033 km2 and a slight asymmetry in favor of the left side of the basin. For the entire basin of Someș, the asymmetry on left becomes pronounced between Dej and Ardusat to change in the opposite direction after receiving the Lăpuș on the right side. The valley of Someșul Mare has much auriferous alluvium that, until the early 20th century, were brought to the surface using traditional tools. Specialists say that in the Someșul Mare were found grains of gold of 21 carats.

Its basin comprises 403 rivers with a total length of 5,528 km, or 7% of the total length of the country. Basin area represents 6.6% of the country area and 71% of the area of Someș–Tisza hydrographic basin.

To prevent flooding, the Someș is dammed in the lower course. In the spring of 1970, due to heavy rains, the Someș flooded part of Satu Mare and surrounding plains. The discharge exceeded 3,300 m3/s compared to that year's average of 210 m3/s.

Tributaries

The following rivers are tributaries to the river Someș:

Left: Someșul Mic, Salca, Olpret, Vad, Șimișna, Iapa, Cormeniș, Valea Leșului, Lozna, Valea Hrăii, Solona, Brâglez, Almaș, Agrij, Apa Sărată, Șoimuș, Bârsa, Inău, Valea Urdii, Horoat, Uileac, Sălaj, Bortura, Runc, Rodina, Bicău, Valea Vinului, Lipău, Valea Morii, Homorodul Nou, Homorodul Vechi
Right: Someșul Mare, Sălătruc, Muncel, Poiana, Vâtroape, Ileanda, Purcăreț, Cheud, Iadăra, Măriușa, Răchitișa, Bârsău, Arieș, Lăpuș, Nistru, Cicârlău, Ilba, Seinel

References 

Rivers of Cluj County
Rivers of Sălaj County
Rivers of Maramureș County
Rivers of Satu Mare County
 
Rivers of Romania
Rivers of Hungary
Geography of Transylvania
International rivers of Europe